In heraldry and architecture, a line which is drawn nebuly (or nebulée) is made up of a series of bulbous protrusions, which are supposed to resemble clouds. The term is derived from the Latin word nebula, "a mist, vapor, or cloud" (OED). A nebuly line meanders in one direction describing the shape of three-quarters of a circle, then similarly in the other direction, maintaining a straight overall trajectory. A fess nebuly is a fess where the two horizontal lines of the fess are nebuly. A shield formed of several such fesses, termed bars where in excess of one, is barry nebuly.

Construction
A nebuly line can be constructed from two parallel rows of circles, one row staggered with respect to the other, so that each circle is tangent to two circles in the other row. Each circle in the lower row should touch the two above at about 45 and 135 degrees and each circle in the upper row should touch the two below at 225 and 315 degrees.

Examples
The mediaeval arms of the Dauntsey family of Wiltshire, England, were barry nebuly. Its use in coats of arms can be seen in the cases of Jones and Munk, both Canada,  FLEETWOOD BOROUGH COUNCIL, England and HYDE BOROUGH COUNCIL, England.
A more notable example is that of the Blount (pronounced Blunt) family of Worcestershire, England, whose members held the titles of Baron Mountjoy and two baronetcies; their arms were Barry nebuly of six or and sable.

References

External links

Heraldry